Birck Elgaaen (2 August 1917 – 7 January 2013) was a Norwegian equestrian who competed in the individual show jumping event at the 1956 Summer Olympics in Stockholm. A member of the Oslo Rideklubb, he was unable to complete the competition. He was born in Oslo, Norway and later became a horse riding instructor.

References

1917 births
2013 deaths
Norwegian male equestrians
Equestrians at the 1956 Summer Olympics
Olympic equestrians of Norway
Sportspeople from Oslo
20th-century Norwegian people